Serbian republic or Serb republic may refer to:

 Serbia or Republika Srbija, a country in Southeastern Europe, and the nation-state of the Serbs
 Socialist Republic of Serbia or Socijalistička Republika Srbija, a federal unit of the Socialist Federal Republic of Yugoslavia, from 1944 to 1992
 Republic of Serbia (1992–2006) or Republika Srbija, a federal unit of the Federal Republic of Yugoslavia from 1992 to 2003, and of the State Union Serbia and Montenegro from 2003 to 2006
 Republika Srpska or "Serb Republic", the Serb entity of Bosnia and Herzegovina in its current form
 Republika Srpska (1992–1995)  or "Serb Republic", the unrecognized Serb entity of Bosnia and Herzegovina from 1992 to 1995
 Republic of Serbian Krajina or Republika Srpska Krajina, war-time Serb breakaway republic in Croatia from 1991 to 1995

See also
 Serbia (disambiguation)
 Serbian (disambiguation)